Tomoxena is a genus of Asian comb-footed spiders (family Theridiidae) that was first described by Eugène Louis Simon in 1895.  it contains three species, found in Asia: T. alearia, T. dives, and T. flavomaculata.

See also
 List of Theridiidae species

References

Further reading

Araneomorphae genera
Spiders of Asia
Theridiidae